Democrats Abroad – Lebanon is the official branch in Lebanon of the organization Democrats Abroad. Democrats Abroad is an official branch of the United States Democratic Party, holds a primary to nominate the Democratic Party candidate for president, sends nominating delegates to the Democratic National Convention, and has seated members of the Democratic National Committee.

Democrats Abroad – Lebanon is part of the Europe, Middle East, and Africa Caucus of Democrats Abroad.

History 
Democrats Abroad – Lebanon unofficially existed beginning in 2000, and was formed under the leadership of Eugene Sensenig-Debbous.

The organization is sending the first delegate from Democrats Abroad in the Middle East, and Arab-American delegate to the Democratic Convention to support Illinois Senator Barack Obama.

References

External links
 "A new Democrats Abroad chapter forms in Lebanon" Christian Science Monitor, January 25, 2008.

Democratic Party (United States)
Diaspora organizations of political parties
Lebanon
American expatriates in Lebanon